Jacques Séverac (1902–1982) was a French film director and screenwriter. He directed 21 films between 1928 and 1962. His film Children of the Sun was entered into the 1962 Cannes Film Festival.

Selected filmography
 La renégate (1947)
 Children of the Sun (1962)

References

External links

1902 births
1982 deaths
French film directors
French male screenwriters
20th-century French screenwriters
20th-century French male writers